Gregor Amann (born 15 August 1962 in Ravensburg, Baden-Württemberg) is a German politician and member of the SPD.

Amann was from 2005 to 2009 a member of the 16th Bundestag, where he represented Frankfurt am Main I.

External links 
  

1962 births
Living people
People from Ravensburg
Goethe University Frankfurt alumni
Members of the Bundestag for Hesse
Members of the Bundestag 2005–2009
Members of the Bundestag for the Social Democratic Party of Germany